The Chinese mitten crab (Shanghainese: du6-zaq8-ha5,  "big sluice crab"), also known as the Shanghai hairy crab (p Shànghǎi máoxiè),  is a medium-sized burrowing crab that is named for its furry claws, which resemble mittens. It is native to rivers, estuaries and other coastal habitats of East Asia from Korea in the north to Fujian, China in the south. It has also been introduced to Europe and North America, where it is considered an invasive species. The species features on the list of invasive alien species of Union concern. This means that import of the species and trade in the species is forbidden in the whole of the European Union.

Description and ecology
This species' distinguishing features are the dense patches of dark setae on its claws. The crab's body is the size of a human palm. The legs are about twice as long as the  carapace.

Mitten crabs spend most of their life in fresh water and return to the sea to breed. During their fourth or fifth year in late summer, the crustaceans migrate downstream and attain sexual maturity in the tidal estuaries. After mating, the females continue seaward, overwintering in deeper waters. They return to brackish water in the spring to hatch their eggs. After development as larvae, the juvenile crabs gradually move upstream into fresh water, thus completing the life cycle.

It moves from freshwater habitats to saltwater habitats once it has reached reproduction maturity. The types of estuaries suitable for the mitten crab is large brackish waters for the larva to develop in, and large shallow waters for the growth of the juvenile crabs. An increase in microplastics has had a significant impact on the population as it affects their metabolism, growth, and oxidative stress response in the liver.

The Chinese mitten crab originates from Hong Kong to the border of Korea. It can be found inland but prefers coastal areas. It is known to settle in rice fields by the sea and rivers inland. The crab is found in subtropical and temperate regions.

Phylogenetically the crab belongs to the Varunidae family which is the newest group of brachyuran crustaceans. Since crabs spawn at the end of their life spans and perish at the end of the breeding cycle, the crabs can live up to 7 (in Germany also 8) years old.

The mitten crab diet is omnivorous. Their main prey consists of worms, mussels, snails, dead organic material, and other small crustaceans and fish.

Reproduction
Mitten crabs start off as fresh-water organisms. In late August, sexual instincts awaken and they begin migrating downstream to the sea, away from their feeding grounds. It is during this migration where the crabs reach puberty and develop their sex organs. The crabs begin to breed in the brackish waters in late fall. The males arrive first and stay in the brackish waters all winter; the females arrive after. The eggs are laid within 24 hours of mating, then attached to the abdomen of the female. After the eggs are attached, the female leaves immediately, heading to the mouth of the river. The larvae hatch from the eggs during the summer, after which they float and drift about the brackish waters. Because the journey to breed for crabs is so great, they only breed once during their lifetimes. The breeding age is normally toward the end of their lifespans. The crabs have sizable egg production count since these crabs only breed once. After the crabs successfully reproduce, they have very little energy and begin to waste away.

Different life stages of the mitten crab:

Invasiveness
This certain species of crab has been spread rapidly from Asia (China and Korea) to North America and Europe, raising concerns that it competes with local species, and its burrowing nature damages embankments and clogs drainage systems. The crabs can make significant inland migrations. It was reported in 1995 that residents of Greenwich saw Chinese mitten crabs coming out of the River Thames, and in 2014 one was found in the Clyde, in Scotland. The crabs have also been known to take up residence in swimming pools. In some places the crabs have been found hundreds of miles from the sea. There is concern in areas with a substantial native crab fishery, such as the Chesapeake Bay in Maryland and the Hudson River in New York (both locations where the crabs were first spotted in 2005), as the impact of the invasion by this species on the native population is unknown.

It is generally illegal to import, transport, or possess live Chinese mitten crabs in the United States, as accidental release or escape risks spreading these crabs to uninfested waters. In addition, some states may have their own restrictions on possession of mitten crabs. California allows fishing for mitten crabs with some restrictions.

The Chinese mitten crab has been introduced into the Great Lakes several times but has not yet been able to establish a permanent population.

The Smithsonian is tracking the spread of the Chinese mitten crab and seeking help to determine the current distribution status of the mitten crab in the Chesapeake Bay region. People are encouraged to report any mitten crab sightings, along with details (date, specific location, size) and a close-up photograph or specimen if possible. The first confirmed record along the East coast of the United States was in the Chesapeake Bay near Baltimore, Maryland, in 2005.

Chinese mitten crabs have also invaded German waters, where they destroy fishing nets, hurt native fish species and damage local dams, causing damage of up to 80 million Euros. These crabs migrated from China to Europe as early as 1900 and were first documented by official German reports in 1912 from Aller River. After an investigation by German scientists in 1933, it was thought that the crabs migrated to Europe through ballast water in commercial ships. The crabs are the only freshwater crab species in Germany, and their tendency to dig holes has caused damage to industrial infrastructure and dams.

The first time the crab was brought to Europe was most likely by commercial vessels. Ships must fill their ballast water tanks and during one of these filling events, it could have been the spawning time for the mitten crab. Once the ship reached Europe and emptied its tank, the crab larvae were released. Over time, this repetition would allow for a prominent mitten crab population in Europe. The crab has spread and can be found in Continental Europe, Southern France, United States of America (the San Francisco Bay), and the United Kingdom. A 15-year period in Germany when the crabs were gradually entering Europe is known as the "establishment phase".

Culinary

The crab is an autumnal delicacy in Shanghai cuisine and eastern China. It is prized for the female crab roe, which ripen in the ninth lunar month and the males in the tenth. The crab meat is believed by traditional Chinese medicine practitioners to have a "cooling" (yin) effect on the body.

Chinese spend hundreds of yuan just to taste a small crab from Yangcheng Lake, which are considered a delicacy. Crabs from Yangcheng Lake are especially prized, since they are perceived to have sweeter meat. Most of the Yangcheng crabs are exported to Shanghai and Hong Kong, and high-profit foreign markets. Responding to the spread of the crab to the West, businessmen have started seeing it as a new source of crab for the Chinese market. One proposed scheme involves importing unwanted crabs from Europe, where they are seen as a pest, to replenish local pure-bred stock.

Mitten crabs have exhibited a remarkable ability to survive in highly modified aquatic habitats, including polluted waters. Like some fish, they can also easily tolerate and uptake heavy metals, such as cadmium and mercury. Therefore, the farming and post-harvesting of the species needs proper management if it is used as a food. Concerns have been raised that the population and origin of the crab may be affected because of overfishing of the species in the Yangtze.

In 2010, a Chinese businessman introduced vending machines to sell this species of crab in the subways.

Counterfeit Yangcheng Lake crabs 
Counterfeit crabs are a problem in the hairy crab industry. Due to the high demand for hairy crabs specifically from Yangcheng Lake, many vendors sell hairy crabs from other lakes and claim they are authentic Yangcheng Lake hairy crabs. Although only 3,000 tons of Yangcheng Lake hairy crabs were harvested in 2012, more than 100,000 tons of supposed "Yangcheng" crabs were sold. 

Identifying counterfeit crabs is a hard task, as the Yangcheng Lake hairy crabs look exactly like other hairy crabs. Technology has been implemented to identify fake hairy crabs, such as laser tags, prints, and barcodes, but these are easily forged. Blockchain-based tracing has also been implemented, where caught crabs are entered into a blockchain. However, most of these efforts to catch fake hairy crabs are foiled by "bathing crabs", or crabs that have been imported from elsewhere to be raised in Yangcheng Lake. These crabs usually spend several hours to a couple of weeks in Yangcheng Lake before being sold as real Yangcheng Lake hairy crabs. Efforts to combat bathing crabs are ongoing.

Management efforts
Management efforts have been shown to be very difficult. This is due to its abundance, high reproductive rate, and high physiological tolerance. All the following efforts were attempted but showed little improvement: "catch as many as you can", migration barriers, trapping, raising awareness,  electrical screens, and pulses.

There has been a discussion of capturing the breeding crabs at the river mouths. There have been difficulties in carrying out this plan though. Other strategies such as capturing them when they pile up at dams have proven somewhat effective. The problem arises when the crabs climb the walls of the dams and over into the rivers behind the dams.

References

External links

 Species Profile – Chinese mitten crab (Eriocheir sinensis), National Invasive Species Information Center, United States National Agricultural Library
 Mitten Crab Watch - Smithsonian Environmental Research Center

Crustaceans described in 1853
Edible crustaceans
Freshwater crustaceans of Asia
Grapsoidea
Shanghai cuisine